Kevin Van Winkle (born 1981) is a Colorado politician and a member of the Colorado Senate, representing the 30th district in Douglas County. Previously, he served in the Colorado House of Representatives from the 43rd District, which encompassed Highlands Ranch, Colorado. A Republican, Van Winkle owns a small business based in Highlands Ranch.

Education
He earned a bachelor's degree from Metropolitan State University of Denver.

Political career 
Van Winkle was first elected to the State House in 2014, winning 63.3% of the vote against his Democratic challenger in the general election. Running for re-election in 2016, he again beat his Democratic opponent, winning 60.34% of the vote.

In December 2020, Van Winkle promoted allegations of fraud in the 2020 presidential election, pushing conspiracies about Dominion Voting Systems and endorsing a petition that falsely claimed that there was fraud in the election.

In the aftermath of the 2020 presidential election, on December 7, 2020, Van Winkle and 7 other Republicans demanded to the Speaker of the House KC Becker that a committee be formed on "election integrity" to conduct an audit of the Dominion Voting Systems used in Colorado's 2020 elections in spite of no evidence of issues. The request was rejected, with Becker criticizing it as a promotion of "debunked conspiracy theories."

Following the resignation of state senator Chris Holbert, a Republican vacancy committee appointed Van Winkle to represent District 30 in the State Senate. He was sworn in on June 13, 2022.

In the 2022 elections, Van Winkle was a candidate to represent the newly reapportioned District 30 in the Colorado Senate. The district includes a part of northern Douglas County. Van Winkle's candidacy was successful. In the general election for Senate district 30 held on November 8, 2022, he defeated his Democratic Party opponent, winning 53.82% of the total votes cast.

References

External links
 Campaign website
 State House website

21st-century American politicians
Living people
Republican Party members of the Colorado House of Representatives
Metropolitan State University of Denver alumni
People from Highlands Ranch, Colorado
Republican Party Colorado state senators
1981 births